Qezel Yul (also Romanized as Qezel Yūl; also known as Qezel Yāl and Qezel Yol) is a village in Keyvan Rural District, in the Central District of Khoda Afarin County, East Azerbaijan Province, Iran. At the 2006 census, its population was 239, in 50 families.

References 

Populated places in Khoda Afarin County